Madang Township (Mandarin: 麻当乡) is a township in Xiahe County, Gannan Tibetan Autonomous Prefecture, Gansu, China. In 2010, Madang Township had a total population of 5,662: 2,899 males and 2,763 females: 1,034 aged under 14, 4,054 aged between 15 and 65 and 574 aged over 65.

References 

Xiahe County
Township-level divisions of Gansu